Zacchaeus was a tax-collector at Jericho, mentioned in the Gospel of Luke.

Zacchaeus may also refer to:

 "Zacchaeus" (song), a traditional Christian children's song
 Zacchaeus of Jerusalem (died 116 AD?), 2nd-century Christian saint
 Alphaeus and Zacchaeus, 4th-century Christian martyrs
 Zacchaeus Chesoni (died 1999), Chief Justice of Kenya
 Zacchaeus Okoth (born 1942), Roman Catholic Archbishop of Kisumu in Kenya
 Zacchaeus Community Kitchen and Zacchaeus Free Clinic in Washington, DC, that became Bread for the City